Igor Jelić (born 28 December 1989) is a Serbian footballer who plays as a midfielder for Sông Lam Nghệ An.

After playing with Bežanija in the Serbian First League, he moved during the winter break of the 2014–15 season to Serbian SuperLiga side FK Donji Srem.

Honours

Club
Zestafoni
 Georgian Super Cup: 2012
Lokomotiv 
 Uzbekistan Super League: 2018

References

External links
 Igor Jelić stats at utakmica.rs
 Igor Jelić stats at footballdatabase.eu

1989 births
Living people
People from Postojna
Association football midfielders
Serbian footballers
Serbian expatriate footballers
FK Sinđelić Beograd players
FK Voždovac players
FK Mladost Apatin players
OFK Beograd players
FK Novi Pazar players
FK Bežanija players
FK Donji Srem players
FK BSK Borča players
NK Travnik players
FC AGMK players
PFC Lokomotiv Tashkent players
SHB Da Nang FC players
Serbian SuperLiga players
Serbian First League players
Erovnuli Liga players
Premier League of Bosnia and Herzegovina players
Uzbekistan Super League players
V.League 1 players
Serbian expatriate sportspeople in Georgia (country)
Serbian expatriate sportspeople in Bosnia and Herzegovina
Serbian expatriate sportspeople in Uzbekistan
Serbian expatriate sportspeople in Vietnam
Expatriate footballers in Georgia (country)
Expatriate footballers in Bosnia and Herzegovina
Expatriate footballers in Uzbekistan
Expatriate footballers in Vietnam